Managundi is a village in Dharwad district of Karnataka, India.

Demographics 
As of the 2011 Census of India there were 941 households in Managundi and a total population of 4,918 consisting of 2,546 males and 2,372 females. There were 656 children ages 0-6.

References

Villages in Dharwad district